"Lifestyle" is a song by American singer Jason Derulo featuring Adam Levine. It was released on January 21, 2021, by Artist Partner Group and Atlantic Records.

Background 
Jason Derulo announced the single through his social media accounts on January 17, 2021, and it was made available for pre-order. In said social media posts, Derulo referred to this track being the start of a "new era," which made media outlets expect the upcoming release of Derulo's fifth studio album and first since 2015's Everything Is 4.

The song would later be included on the deluxe edition of Maroon 5's seventh studio album Jordi, despite the song having no involvement from the band members outside of Levine.

Release and music video 
"Lifestyle" was released for digital download and streaming on January 21, 2021, alongside the official music video which currently has 23 million views on YouTube as of March 2023. Adam Levine does not appear in the video for unknown reasons.

Composition and lyrics 
The premise of the song sees Jason Derulo and Adam Levine attempting to pursue a woman with high-class tastes. Within the track Derulo makes references to Rihanna's hit "Diamonds" and Future's 2015 song "Fuck Up Some Commas". In terms of musical notation, the song is composed in the key of B♭ minor, with a tempo of 123 beats per minute, and runs for 2:33.

Charts

Weekly charts

Year-end charts

Certifications

Release history

References 

2021 songs
2021 singles
Jason Derulo songs
Adam Levine songs
Number-one singles in Poland
Disco songs
Songs written by Amy Allen (songwriter)
Songs written by Adam Levine
Atlantic Records singles
Songs written by Jason Derulo
Songs written by Jacob Kasher
Songs written by Pablo Bowman